The Clinton House is a historic house museum at 930 West Clinton Drive in Fayetteville, Arkansas.  Built in 1931, it was the first home of Bill Clinton and Hillary Rodham while they both taught at the University of Arkansas School of Law and was where they married in 1975.  The house was listed on the National Register of Historic Places in 2010.

History
Upon completion in 1931 in the Tudor Revival architectural style the house was inhabited by H. H. Taylor, owner of the Fayetteville Daily Leader. Later the house was bought by Gilbert C. Swanson, who was married to Roberta Fulbright, sister of J. William Fulbright. On August 11, 1975, Bill Clinton purchased the house for $17,200.00. Both Bill and Hillary were teaching at the University of Arkansas School of Law in 1975, and they were married in the living room on October 11, 1975. Bill became Arkansas Attorney General in November, 1976 and they sold the house in 1983. From 1977 to 1983, the Clintons rented the home to law students.

Clinton House Museum
The house operates as a museum and contains some pieces of Clinton election memorabilia dating to prior to his run for United States President, rooms interpreted for the 1970s, and temporary exhibits related to local history or the Clinton legacy of public service and civic engagement. There is also a replica of Hillary's wedding dress. The house is located on what was once California Boulevard; the street was renamed Clinton Drive in 2010. The museum is one of four stops on the "Billgrimage", the other three being the Clinton Birthplace in Hope, Arkansas, the Hot Springs Visitors Center, and the Bill Clinton Presidential Library.

See also
 List of residences of presidents of the United States
National Register of Historic Places listings in Washington County, Arkansas

References

External links

 Clinton House Museum - official site

Houses on the National Register of Historic Places in Arkansas
Tudor Revival architecture in Arkansas
Houses completed in 1931
Museums in Washington County, Arkansas
Houses in Fayetteville, Arkansas
Presidential museums in Arkansas
Biographical museums in Arkansas
Bill Clinton
Hillary Clinton
Houses in Washington County, Arkansas
Tourist attractions in Fayetteville, Arkansas
National Register of Historic Places in Fayetteville, Arkansas